George Millar may refer to:

 George Millar (writer) (1910–2005), awarded the MC for his escape during World War II which he wrote about in Horned Pigeon
 George Millar (footballer) (1874–?), Scottish footballer
 George Millar (singer), singer, songwriter and guitarist with The Irish Rovers

See also
George Miller (disambiguation)
 Georgy Millyar